Syrovatka (Ukrainian: Сироватка) is a railway station in Nyzhnya Syrovatka, Sumy Oblast, Ukraine. The station is on the Sumy Directorate of Southern Railways on the Basy-Boromlya line.

History

In May 2016, the construction of a ramp for people with disabilities at the entrance to the waiting room of the station building at Syrovatka was completed by the Sumy Construction and Installation Maintenance Department (BMEU-5) of Southern Railways.

Passenger service

Both passenger and suburban trains stop at Syrovatka station.

Notes

 Tariff Guide No. 4. Book 1 (as of 05/15/2021) (Russian) Archived 05/15/2021.
 Arkhangelsky A.S., Arkhangelsky V.A. in two books. - M.: Transport, 1981. (rus.)

References

External links
Syrovatka on railwayz.info
Ukrzaliznytsia site for passenger train schedule
Suburban train schedule

Railway stations in Sumy Oblast
Sumy
Buildings and structures in Sumy Oblast
Railway stations opened in 1878